The  was an earthquake that occurred near the border between Niigata and Nagano prefectures at 3:59 JST on March 12, 2011. The depth of the hypocenter was 8 km and magnitude of the earthquake was  6.7.

The strongest shaking was felt in Sakae, Nagano, where a maximum JMA intensity of shindo 6+ was recorded. Three people were killed.

Relationship with the Tōhoku earthquake 
The earthquake occurred only around 13 hours after the Great East Japan Earthquake, the epicenter of which was located offshore in the Tōhoku region. For this reason it is believed that the Nagano earthquake was a remotely triggered earthquake caused by the Great East Japan Earthquake.

Since this earthquake occurred immediately after the Tōhoku earthquake, itself an event which caused unprecedented damage, the amount of coverage by mass media of the Nagano earthquake was less than that afforded to the Tōhoku earthquake.

A magnitude 6.0 earthquake occurred in three days later in Shizuoka on March 15, 2011, which was also considered to be an induced earthquake of the Tōhoku earthquake.

References

External links
M 6.2 - 13 km E of Arai, Japan – U.S. Geological Survey

Sakae, Nagano
History of Nagano Prefecture
2011 earthquakes
2011 Tōhoku earthquake and tsunami
March 2011 events in Japan
Earthquakes of the Heisei period
2011 disasters in Japan
Events in Nagano (city)